Simona Hunyadi Murph is a Romanian-American scientist, engineer, and inventor at Savannah River National Laboratory (Aiken, South Carolina), and she is an Adjunct Professor in the Physics & Astronomy Department at the University of Georgia (in Athens, Georgia, United States).

Biography

Early life
As a young child, Simona was inspired to study chemistry both by her mother's elaborate Romanian cooking and by scientist Marie Curie's life.

Education
She received her Bachelor of Science in Chemistry & Physics in 1995 from Babeș-Bolyai University, in Cluj-Napoca, Romania. Directly after, she went on for her Master of Science in Chemistry/Electrochemistry at the same university, graduating in 1996.

In 2007, Murph obtained her Doctor of Philosophy degree in Chemistry/Nanotechnology at the University of South Carolina (in Columbia, SC).  In 2012, she went further to earn her Education Specialist degree in Educational Leadership & Administration at Augusta University (in Augusta, GA).

Career
Simona Murph has worked in a number of capacities at universities. She has also inspired others at Savannah River National Laboratories where she has worked as a senior scientist, fellow scientist, environmental manager, outreach program coordinator, and program manager. One project she founded and manages is the Group for Innovation & Advancements in Nano-Technology Sciences (GIANTS). "This program includes undergraduate and graduate students, as well as postdoctoral researchers from the University of South Carolina, University of Georgia, Clemson University, Georgia Institute of Technology, and Augusta University."

Awards and honors
Murph has won numerous awards including:

United States Department of Energy - “Inspirational Woman in STEM” 
Savannah River National Laboratory : NNSA Programs - Women at the Forefront of their Field of Expertise Recognition, 2011
Savannah River National Laboratory - Key Contributor Award: for Nanotechnology Advances in the Field, 2015
Savannah River National Laboratory - Exceptional Leadership Award, 2016
SRNL Director's Award for Exceptional Scientific and Engineering Achievement, 2017
SRNL Laboratory Directed Research and Development Program - Most Valuable Project Award, 2019

Societies
Minerals, Metals & Materials Society - Board of Directors 
Frontiers in Nanoenergy, Technologies, and Materials - Editorial Board

Publications
Simona has over 160 publications. Her most cited work has been cited over 3200 times. Below is a sampling of her most cited works, each one has been cited more than 400 times:

Anisotropic metal nanoparticles: synthesis, assembly, and optical applications - CJ Murphy, TK Sau, AM Gole, CJ Orendorff, J Gao, L Gou, SE Hunyadi, ...
The Journal of Physical Chemistry B, (2005)

Chemical sensing and imaging with metallic nanorods - CJ Murphy, AM Gole, SE Hunyadi, JW Stone, PN Sisco, A Alkilany, ...
Chemical Communications, (2008)
	
One-dimensional colloidal gold and silver nanostructures - CJ Murphy, AM Gole, SE Hunyadi, CJ Orendorff
Inorganic chemistry, (2006)

Patents
Murph has been awarded multiple patents including a few in the year 2020:

Methods and materials for determination of distribution coefficients for separation materials, US10598599B2
Radiation Detectors Employing Contemporaneous Detection and Decontamination, US20200082954A1
Controlled Release of Hydrogen from Composite Nanoparticles, US20180319658A1

References

External links

Living people
Year of birth missing (living people)
Romanian women engineers
Women inventors
Romanian emigrants to the United States
Romanian inventors
American inventors
American women chemists
Romanian physicists
American astrophysicists
American women physicists
Science communication award winners
21st-century American physicists
Expatriate academics in the United States
21st-century American women scientists
University of Georgia faculty
Babeș-Bolyai University alumni
Augusta University alumni
University of South Carolina alumni
American women academics
American women engineers